Iron meteorites, also known as siderites, or ferrous meteorites, are a type of meteorite that consist overwhelmingly of an iron–nickel alloy known as meteoric iron that usually consists of two mineral phases: kamacite and taenite. Most iron meteorites originate from cores of planetesimals, with the exception of the IIE iron meteorite group

The iron found in iron meteorites was one of the earliest sources of usable iron available to humans, due to the malleability and ductility of the meteoric iron, before the development of smelting that signaled the beginning of the Iron Age.

Occurrence
Although they are fairly rare compared to the stony meteorites, comprising only about 5.7% of witnessed falls, iron meteorites have historically been heavily over-represented in meteorite collections. This is due to several factors: 
 They are easily recognized as unusual, as opposed to stony meteorites. Modern-day searches for meteorites in deserts and Antarctica yield a much more representative sample of meteorites overall.
 They are much more resistant to weathering.
 They are much more likely to survive atmospheric entry, and are more resistant to the resulting ablation. Hence, they are more likely to be found as large pieces.
 They can be found even when buried by use of surface metal detecting equipment, due to their metallic composition.
Because they are also denser than stony meteorites, iron meteorites also account for almost 90% of the mass of all known meteorites, about 500 tons. All the largest known meteorites are of this type, including the largest—the Hoba meteorite.

Origin
Iron meteorites have been linked to M-type asteroids because both have similar spectral characteristics in the visible and near-infrared. Iron meteorites are thought to be the fragments of the cores of larger ancient asteroids that have been shattered by impacts. The heat released from the radioactive decay of the short-lived nuclides 26Al and 60Fe is considered as a plausible cause for the melting and differentiation of their parent bodies in the early Solar System. Melting produced from the heat of impacts is another cause of melting and differentiation. The IIE iron meteorites may be a notable exception, in that they probably originate from the crust of S-type asteroid 6 Hebe.

Chemical and isotope analysis indicates that at least about 50 distinct parent bodies were involved. This implies that there were once at least this many large, differentiated, asteroids in the asteroid belt – many more than today.

Composition
The overwhelming bulk of these meteorites consists of the FeNi-alloys kamacite and taenite. Minor minerals, when occurring, often form rounded nodules of troilite or graphite, surrounded by schreibersite and cohenite. Schreibersite and troilite also occur as plate shaped inclusions, which show up on cut surfaces as cm-long and mm-thick lamellae. The troilite plates are called Reichenbach lamellae.

The chemical composition is dominated by the elements Fe, Ni and Co, which make up more than 95%. Ni is always present; the concentration is nearly always higher than 5% and may be as high as about 25%. A significant percentage of nickel can be used in the field to distinguish meteoritic irons from man-made iron products, which usually contain lower amounts of Ni, but it is not enough to prove meteoritic origin.

Use

Iron meteorites were historically used for their meteoric iron, which was forged into cultural objects, tools or weapons. With the advent of smelting and the beginning of the Iron Age the importance of iron meteorites as a resource decreased, at least in those cultures that developed those techniques. In Ancient Egypt and other civilizations before the Iron Age, iron was as valuable as gold, since both came from meteorites, for example Tutankhamun's meteoric iron dagger. The Inuit used the Cape York meteorite for a much longer time. Iron meteorites themselves were sometimes used unaltered as collectibles or even religious symbols (e.g. Clackamas worshiping the Willamette meteorite). Today iron meteorites are prized collectibles for academic institutions and individuals. Some are also tourist attractions as in the case of the Hoba meteorite.

Classification
Two classifications are in use: the classic structural classification and the newer chemical classification.

Structural classification
The older structural classification is based on the presence or absence of the Widmanstätten pattern, which can be assessed from the appearance of polished cross-sections that have been etched with acid. This is connected with the relative abundance of nickel to iron. The categories are:
 Hexahedrites (H): low nickel, no Widmanstätten pattern, may present Neumann lines;
 Octahedrites (O): average to high nickel, Widmanstätten patterns, most common class. They can be further divided up on the basis of the width of the kamacite lamellae from coarsest to finest.
Coarsest (Ogg): lamellae width > 3.3 mm
Coarse (Og): lamellae width 1.3–3.3 mm
Medium (Om): lamellae width 0.5–1.3 mm
Fine (Of): lamellae width 0.2–0.5 mm
Finest (Off): lamellae width < 0.2 mm
Plessitic (Opl): a transitional structure between octahedrites and ataxites
 Ataxites (D): very high nickel, no Widmanstätten pattern, rare.

Chemical classification
A newer chemical classification scheme based on the proportions of the trace elements Ga, Ge and Ir separates the iron meteorites into classes corresponding to distinct asteroid parent bodies. This classification is based on diagrams that plot nickel content against different trace elements (e.g. Ga, Ge and Ir). The different iron meteorite groups appear as data point clusters.

There were originally four of these groups designated by the Roman numerals I, II, III, IV. When more chemical data became available these were split, e.g. Group IV was split into IVA and IVB meteorites. Even later some groups got joined again when intermediate meteorites were discovered, e.g. IIIA and IIIB were combined into the IIIAB meteorites.

In 2006 iron meteorites were classified into 13 groups (one for uncategorized irons):

IAB
 IA: Medium and coarse octahedrites, 6.4-8.7% Ni, 55-100 ppm Ga, 190-520 ppm Ge, 0.6–5.5 ppm Ir, Ge-Ni correlation negative.
 IB: Ataxites and medium octahedrites, 8.7–25% Ni, 11–55 ppm Ga, 25–190 ppm Ge, 0.3-2 ppm Ir, Ge-Ni correlation negative.
 IC: 6.1–6.8% Ni. The Ni concentrations are positively correlated with As (4–9 μg/g), Au (0.6–1.0 μg/g) and P (0.17–0.40%) and negatively correlated with Ga (54–42 μg/g), Ir (9–0.07 μg/g) and W (2.4–0.8 μg/g). 
 IIAB
 IIA: Hexahedrites, 5.3–5.7% Ni, 57–62 ppm Ga, 170–185 ppm Ge, 2-60ppm Ir.
 IIB: Coarsest octahedrites, 5.7–6.4% Ni, 446-59 pm Ga, 107–183 ppm Ge, 0.01–0.5 ppm Ir, Ge-Ni correlation negative.
 IIC: Plessitic octahedrites, 9.3–11.5% Ni, 37–39 ppm Ga, 88–114 ppm Ge, 4–11 ppm Ir, Ge-Ni correlation positive
 IID: Fine to medium octahedrites, 9.8–11.3%Ni, 70–83 ppm Ga, 82–98 ppm Ge, 3.5–18 ppm Ir, Ge-Ni correlation positive
 IIE: octahedrites of various coarseness, 7.5–9.7% Ni, 21–28 ppm Ga, 60–75 ppm Ge, 1–8 ppm Ir, Ge-Ni correlation absent
 IIIAB: Medium octahedrites, 7.1–10.5% Ni, 16–23 ppm Ga, 27–47 ppm Ge, 0.01-19 ppm Ir
 IIICD: Ataxites to fine octahedrites, 10–23% Ni, 1.5–27 ppm Ga, 1.4–70 ppm Ge, 0.02–0.55 ppm Ir
 IIIE: Coarse octahedrites, 8.2–9.0% Ni, 17–19 ppm Ga, 3–37 ppm Ge, 0.05-6 ppm Ir, Ge-Ni correlation absent
 IIIF: Medium to coarse octahedrites, 6.8–7.8% Ni,6.3–7.2 ppm Ga, 0.7–1.1 ppm Ge, 1.3–7.9 ppm Ir, Ge-Ni correlation absent
 IVA: Fine octahedrites, 7.4–9.4% Ni, 1.6–2.4 ppm Ga, 0.09–0.14 ppm Ge, 0.4-4 ppm Ir, Ge-Ni correlation positive
 IVB: Ataxites, 16–26% Ni, 0.17–0.27 ppm Ga, 0,03–0,07 ppm Ge, 13–38 ppm Ir, Ge-Ni correlation positive
 Ungrouped meteorites. This is actually quite a large collection (about 15% of the total) of over 100 meteorites that do not fit into any of the larger classes above, and come from about 50 distinct parent bodies.

Additional groups and grouplets are discussed in the scientific literature:

 IIG: Hexahedrites with coarse schreibersite. Meteoric iron has low nickel concentration.

Magmatic and nonmagmatic (primitive) irons 
The iron meteorites were previously divided into two classes: magmatic irons and non magmatic or primitive irons. Now this definition is deprecated.

Stony–iron meteorites
There are also specific categories for mixed-composition meteorites, in which iron and 'stony' materials are combined.

 II) Stony–iron meteorites
 Pallasites
 Main group pallasites
 Eagle station pallasite grouplet
 Pyroxene Pallasite grouplet
 Mesosiderite group

Gallery

See also
Glossary of meteoritics
Hraschina meteorite
Meteoritics

References

External links

 Meteorite articles, including discussions of iron meteorites, in Planetary Science Research Discoveries
 Iron Meteorite images from Meteorites Australia